Chris Bratton (born January 16, 1969) is a drummer involved in the hardcore punk scene since 1983. He has drummed in several influential bands including Justice League, No For An Answer, Chain Of Strength, Inside Out, Statue, Drive Like Jehu and Wool.

References

1969 births
Living people
American punk rock drummers
American male drummers
American rock drummers
20th-century American drummers
20th-century American male musicians
Wool (band) members
Musicians from Orange County, California